Dalmar Abuzeid (born October 23, 1990) is a Canadian actor. He initially became known for portraying Danny Van Zandt in Degrassi: The Next Generation from 2004 until 2010. Since Degrassi, he has appeared in a variety of television series such as Murdoch Mysteries (2014), Hemlock Grove (2015), Shoot the Messenger (2016), Crawford (2018), and The Comey Rule (2020). 

In 2019, Abuzeid earned acclaim for his performance in the Netflix series Anne with an E, winning an ACTRA Award and a Canadian Screen Award. With this role, Abuzeid became the first Black actor to perform in the history of the Anne of Green Gables media franchise.

Career

Acting
Abuzeid rose to promience for portraying the character Danny Van Zandt on the popular Canadian television series Degrassi: The Next Generation. During this time, he also played a main role on the Teletoon series Majority Rules!. Following Degrassi, Abuzeid went on to appear in a variety of television series such as Murdoch Mysteries (2014), Hemlock Grove (2015), Shoot the Messenger (2016), Crawford (2018), and The Comey Rule (2020). In addition to acting, he has also been a host of TVOKids, and the Kids CBC series Snapshots.

From 2018 to 2019, Abuzeid portrayed Sebastian 'Bash' Lacroix in the second and third seasons of Anne with an E; this marked the first time that a Black character has been featured since the franchise's inception. He won the Canadian Screen Award for Best Guest Performance in a Drama Series at the 8th Canadian Screen Awards in 2020. He also won an ACTRA Award for his performance in Anne with an E.

Music

Abuzeid played bass in the band SoundSpeed, a six-piece music group that also included four other Degrassi cast members Raymond Ablack (lead vocalist), Jamie Johnston (guitarist), Shane Kippel (drums), and Scott Paterson (keytar). They released a three-song EP in January 2010.

Filmography

Film

Television

References

External links

1990 births
Living people
21st-century Canadian bass guitarists
21st-century Canadian male actors
Black Canadian broadcasters
Black Canadian male actors
Black Canadian musicians
Canadian male child actors
Canadian male television actors
Canadian people of Sudanese descent
Canadian Screen Award winners
Canadian television hosts
Male actors from Toronto
Musicians from Toronto